Saunders Rock is a rock 3 nautical miles (6 km) northwest of Feeley Peak, between Davisville and Quonset Glaciers on the north side of Wisconsin Range. Mapped by United States Geological Survey (USGS) from surveys and U.S. Navy air photos, 1960–64. Named by Advisory Committee on Antarctic Names (US-ACAN) for John T. Saunders, electronics technician, Byrd Station winter party, 1960.

Rock formations of Marie Byrd Land